Love Kills is a 1998 comedy film written and directed by Mario Van Peebles. The film stars Van Peebles, Lesley Ann Warren, and Daniel Baldwin.

Plot
A masseur gets mixed up in the family plots at the mansion of a recently deceased Beverly Hills millionaire.

Cast
Mario Van Peebles as Poe Finklestein
Lesley Ann Warren as Evelyn Heiss
Donovan Leitch as Dominique
Loretta Devine as Sylvia Finkelstein
Louise Fletcher as Alena Heiss
Daniel Baldwin as Danny Tucker
Robert LaSardo as Diesel
Alexis Arquette as James
Sen Dog as Derrick
Lucy Liu as Kashi
Susan Ruttan as Lela
Melvin Van Peebles as Abel
Mark Buntzman as The Accountant
Michael Winters as The Lawyer
Philip Moon as The Rookie Cop
Vincent Schiavelli as Emmet
Margaret Avery as Moon
Steve Moore as Stephen
James Pax as Rookie Cop #2
Sattya Sukhu as Male Servant
Chittra Sukhu as Lawyer #2
Fatlip as Rapper
Kailani Bayot as Kashi's Friend
Maria Marx as Woman in the Desert

References

External links
 
 

1998 comedy films
Films directed by Mario Van Peebles
American comedy films
1990s English-language films
1990s American films